American country music singer Mindy McCready released five studio albums and charted over ten singles on the U.S. Billboard Hot Country Songs charts. Her 1996 debut Ten Thousand Angels was her most commercially successful disc, producing the hit singles "Ten Thousand Angels", "Guys Do It All the Time", and "A Girl's Gotta Do (What a Girl's Gotta Do)".

Studio albums

Compilation albums

Singles

Guest singles

Music videos

Notes

References

Discographies of American artists
Country music discographies